AngloGold Ashanti Limited is a global gold mining company. It was formed in 2004 by the merger of AngloGold and the Ashanti Goldfields Corporation. It is now a global gold producer with 21 operations on four continents. The company is listed on the New York, Johannesburg, Accra, London and Australian stock exchanges, as well as the Paris and Brussels bourses.

In 2008, AngloGold produced 4.98 million ounces of gold from its operations, estimated to be seven percent of the global production. In 2009, the company's gold output dropped to 4.6 million ounces. As of the third quarter of 2014, Anglogold was the world's third-largest producer of gold, behind Barrick Gold and Newmont Mining. The company is claimed to be the 'most sophisticated and technologically advanced' mining operations with strict adherence to safety regulations.

History
AngloGold Ashanti was formed on 26 April 2004, after the High Court of Ghana approved the merger of AngloGold and the Ashanti Goldfields Corporation three days earlier. AngloGold had been a gold mining company based in South Africa, majority-owned by the Anglo American group. This came almost a year after the merger was announced on 16 May 2003. In the transaction, Ashanti shareholders received 0.29 ordinary shares of AngloGold for every Ashanti share.

The new company sold its Union Reef Gold Mine in the Northern Territory of Australia in August 2004, followed by the sale of the Freda-Rebecca Gold Mine in Zimbabwe a month later.

In late 2007, Mark Cutifani replaced Bobby Godsell as CEO of AngloGold Ashanti, being appointed a director of the company on 17 September 2007 and as CEO on 1 October that year.

In January 2009, AngloGold Ashanti sold its 33% stake in the Boddington Gold Mine in Australia to Newmont Mining for US$1.0 billion.

Russell Edey, chairman of AngloGold since 2002 and, after the merger also of AngloGold Ashanti, was replaced by Tito Mboweni in May 2010. The company's Tau Lekoa Gold Mine in South Africa was sold to Buffelsfontein Gold Mines Limited in February 2009, with ownership being transferred on 1 August 2010.

The company announced the elimination of the last of its hedge book in October 2010. The company had hedged 11.3 million ounces of gold, as of early 2008, under previous CEO Bobby Godsell. Under its new CEO, this was gradually reduced to 3.22 million. In October 2010, this remaining amount was paid off with US$2.63 billion, or US$1,300 per ounce of gold.

In 2020 it sold its last South African mining assets to Harmony Gold for about R4.4 billion. It no longer has any operations left in South Africa but remains listed on the JSE.

AngloGold Ashanti is a signatory participant of the Voluntary Principles on Security and Human Rights.

Chief Financial Officer Christine Ramon becomes interim CEO on 1 September 2020, following the resignation of Kelvin Dushnisky. There has been speculation that Dushnisky stepped down after shareholders questioned a bonus payment he received from his prior employer Barrick Gold while also taking a signing bonus from AngloGold Ashanti when he was appointed CEO in 2018.

Criticism

In August 2008 British charity War on Want published a report accusing Anglo American (who at the time owned 17% of AngloGold Ashanti) of profiting from the abuse of people in the developing countries in which the company operates. The company disclosed itself in 2006 or in 2008 for unacceptable safety performance in its platinum mines. Safety measures were taken. Additionally, in 2005 the staff of the AGA exploration team in Ituri made a US$8,000 payment to the FNI, which had been accused of committing various humans rights abuses.

In January 2011, AngloGold Ashanti was awarded the Public Eye Global Award at the Public Eye Awards hosted with Greenpeace in Davos, Switzerland by the Erklärung von Bern, known in English as the Berne Convention. The award has been interpreted as being for the "most irresponsible company". The nominating organisation, WACAM (Wassa Association of Communities Affected by Mining), said the company had a history of "gross human rights violations and environmental problems."

Key figures

Financial
Financial figures for the company:

Gold production
Gold production figures for the company's mines since 2004 in ounces per annum were

 Figures for 2004 for Freda-Rebecca, Siguiri, Bibiani, Iduapriem and Obuasi are for the period from May to December, from the merger onwards, having belonged to Ashanti Goldfields Corporation before the merger.
 Percentage figures behind names indicate the share of production of the mine belonging to AngloGold Ashanti. Production figures shown are those belonging to AngloGold Ashanti, not overall production.
 1 The Bibiani Gold Mine was sold 1 December 2006.
 2 The Moab Khotsong Gold Mine started production in 2006.
 3 The Freda-Rebecca Gold Mine was sold 1 September 2004.
 4 The Tau Lekoa Gold Mine was sold to Buffelsfontein Gold Mines Limited, with ownership being transferred on 1 August 2010.

Carbon footprint
AngloGold Ashanti reported Total CO2e emissions (Direct + Indirect) for 31 December 2019 at 2,570 Kt (-1/ y-o-y).

Fatalities
Fatalities in the South African gold mining industry, especially the underground mines, are common. As of 2009, 100 to 120 were reported every year. This did represent an improvement since 2007: AngloGold Ashanti has reduced the number of fatalities in its operations by 70%. One of the main reasons for this development was a program led by CEO Mark Cutifani aimed at reducing the company's number of fatalities to zero by 2015. Of the 16 fatalities experienced by the company in 2009, 13 were in South Africa (2007: 27 of 34, 2008: 11 of 14). Statistics company fatalities since 2004 founding:

See also
Sam E. Jonah (ACSM), former president of AngloGold Ashanti.
Gold as an investment

References

Sources
AngloGold's response to Human Rights Watch allegations (pdf), 2005.
D.R. Congo: Gold Fuels Massive Human Rights Atrocities – Human Rights Watch article
Anglo American: The Alternative Report

External links

 
A Glittering Demon: Mining, Poverty and Politics in the Democratic Republic of Congo

 
Companies based in Johannesburg
Companies listed on the New York Stock Exchange
South African companies established in 2004
Gold mining companies of South Africa
Companies listed on the Ghana Stock Exchange
Non-renewable resource companies established in 2004
Uranium mining companies of South Africa
2004 establishments in South Africa
Gold mining companies of the Democratic Republic of the Congo